The Coolpix 5400 was a 5.1 megapixel 'prosumer' digital camera produced by Nikon. Announced at the end of May 2003 as the immediate successor to the Nikon Coolpix 5000, it features  4x optical zoom, 4x digital zoom, and many other functions.

Technical specification

 Max resolution: 2592 x 1944
 Low resolution: 2592 x 1728, 1600 x 1200, 1280 x 960, 1024 x 768, 640 x 480
 Image ratio w:h: 4:3, 3:2
 Effective pixels: 5.0 million
 Sensor photo detectors: 5.2 million
 Sensor size: 1/1.8" (7.18 x 5.32 mm, 0.38 cm2)
 Pixel density: 13 MP/cm2
 Sensor type: CCD
 Sensor manufacturer: Unknown
 ISO rating: Auto, 50, 100, 200, 400
 Zoom wide (W): 28 mm
 Zoom tele (T): 116 mm (4.1x)
 Digital zoom: Yes, 4x
 Image stabilization: No
 Auto Focus: Unknown
 Manual Focus: Yes
 Normal focus range: 50 cm
 Macro focus range: 1 cm
 White balance override  5 positions, fine tunable, manual preset
 Aperture range: F2.8 - F8.0
 Min shutter: 8 sec
 Max shutter: 1/4000 sec
 Built-in Flash: Yes
 Flash range: 3 m
 External flash: Yes, ISO 518 hot-shoe
 Flash modes: Auto, Fill-in, Red-Eye reduction, Slow (front/rear), Off
 Exposure compensation: -2 to +2 EV in 1/3 EV steps
 Metering: 256 segment Matrix, Center-Weighted, Spot, Spot AF Area
 Aperture priority: no
 Shutter priority: Yes
 Lens thread: Req. optional adapter (28 mm)
 Continuous Drive: Yes, 3 frame/s, max 7 images
 Movie Clips: Yes, 640 x 480 up to 70 sec, 320 x 240 up to 180 sec (both 15 frame/s with audio)
 Remote control: Yes, USB wired (Optional) - MC-EU1
 Self-timer: Yes, 3 or 10 sec
 Timelapse recording: Yes
 Orientation sensor: No
 Storage types: Compact Flash (Type I or II)
 Storage included: 16 MB Compact Flash
 Uncompressed format: Yes, TIFF, RAW with firmware 1.4
 Quality Levels: Hi, Fine, Normal, Basic
 Viewfinder: Optical (Tunnel)
 LCD: 1.5 "
 LCD Dots: 134,000
 Live View: No
 USB: USB 1.0 (1.5 Mbit/s)
 HDMI: No
 Wireless: No
 Environmentally sealed: No
 Battery: Nikon EN-EL1 Lithium-Ion & charger included or 2CR5
 Weight (inc. batteries): 400 g (14.1 oz)
 Dimensions: 108 x 73 x 69 mm (4.3 x 2.9 x 2.7 in)
 Notes: BSS, AE-BSS, Fine tunable WB

External links
 Official page
 Digital Photography Review
 Steves Digicams Review
 Interesting photos

References

5400
Cameras introduced in 2003